Brian Baca is an American politician and educator serving as a member of the New Mexico House of Representatives from the 8th district. He was appointed to the House by the Valencia County Board of Commissioners on January 13, 2022, succeeding Alonzo Baldonado.

Early life and education 
A native of Los Lunas, New Mexico, Baca attended Los Lunas High School. He earned a Bachelor of Science degree in psychology and Master of Arts in educational leadership from the University of New Mexico.

Career 
From 1994 to 2001, Baca worked as a teacher at White Mountain Intermediate School in Ruidoso, New Mexico. He taught in the gifted and talented program at Daniel Fernandez Intermediate School from 2001 to 2005. In 2005 and 2006, he was assistant principal of Manzano Vista Middle School. He served as director of special education for Los Lunas Public Schools from 2007 to 2011,  director of personnel until 2012, and assistant superintendent from 2012 to 2018. Baca has served as deputy superintendent of Los Lunas Public Schools since 2018. He is also a member of the American Association of School Personnel Administrators. He was appointed to the New Mexico House of Representatives by members of the Valencia County Board of Commissioners on January 13, 2022, succeeding Alonzo Baldonado.

References 

Living people
Educators from New Mexico
People from Los Lunas, New Mexico
Republican Party members of the New Mexico House of Representatives
University of New Mexico alumni
Year of birth missing (living people)
Hispanic and Latino American state legislators in New Mexico